Masanów  is a village in the administrative district of Gmina Sieroszewice, within Ostrów Wielkopolski County, Greater Poland Voivodeship, in west-central Poland.

With Masanów is related Paweł Bryliński, a folk sculptor.

Before 1887 it was administrated by Odolanów County. Between 1975 and 1998 it was contained in Kalisz Voivodenship and in 1887-1975 and after 1998 in Ostrów Wielkopolski County.

There is an elementary school.

References

Villages in Ostrów Wielkopolski County